Nikhil Paul George is a British-Indian music producer, singer, composer, and guitarist who is recognised for his efforts working under Indian Music Composer Pritam exclusively for a decade. He is known for collaborating with musicians from all around the world, recording in Mumbai, London, Los Angeles, and Nashville.

After graduating in film music from the Royal College of Music in London in 2009, Nikhil began his career as a music producer and singer. He has worked with renowned Indian composer Pritam, London Symphony Orchestra, London Philharmonic Orchestra, and traditional folk musicians from Africa, Central, and Eastern Europe.

Nikhil is best known in the Indian sub-continent and its diaspora for his work on the film soundtracks for Barfi! (2012) and Shaandaar (2015), where he lent his voice to the hit songs "Main Kya Karoon," "Aashiyaan," and "Nazdeekiyan."

Nikhil's most recent notable work was on the Amazon series Farzi, where he sang the song "Farq Nahi Padta," composed by Sachin–Jigar, and written by Priya Saraiya for series directors Raj & DK. Currently, Nikhil is working on the album "Love In America" as part of his for profit enterprise NPG Music, which aims to mentor, empower, and publish music creators.

Discography
Movies, songs and other works in which George was involved include :

Awards and nominations

Television performances & appearances, Tours

References

External links
 
 Interview with The Hindu
 Interview with The Times Of India
 Interview with Box Office India

Indian male singer-songwriters
Indian singer-songwriters
Living people
Singers from Kerala
21st-century Indian singers
21st-century Indian male singers
Year of birth missing (living people)